Dirick Carver was a Marian Martyr from Brighton who was burnt to death at Lewes on 22 July 1555.

References

1555 deaths
English Protestants
People executed for heresy
Executed British people
People executed under Mary I of England
16th-century Protestant martyrs
Executed people from East Sussex
Year of birth unknown
People executed by the Kingdom of England by burning
People from Brighton
Protestant martyrs of England